The 2018–19 season was Manchester United's 27th season in the Premier League and their 44th consecutive season in the top flight of English football. The season was the first since 2005–06 without club captain Michael Carrick, who retired after the 2017–18 season and joined the club's coaching staff. Assistant manager Rui Faria left the club at the conclusion of that season, with Carrick and Kieran McKenna replacing him as the club's first-team coaches.

A disappointing Premier League campaign saw the club finish in sixth place. United were also eliminated early in the EFL Cup, losing on penalties to Championship side Derby County in the third round. The club reached the quarter-final stage of both the FA Cup and the UEFA Champions League, but were eliminated by Wolverhampton Wanderers and Barcelona respectively. This resulted in United's first consecutive trophyless seasons in 30 years. On 5 May 2019, following a draw at bottom-placed Huddersfield Town, United confirmed their place in the 2019–20 UEFA Europa League, making it the fourth time they had finished outside of the top four in the league since 2014.

On 18 December 2018, with just seven wins in the first 17 league games, manager José Mourinho was sacked. His last game, two days earlier, ended in a 3–1 defeat to Liverpool. The following day, former United striker Ole Gunnar Solskjær was appointed as caretaker manager until the end of the season, assisted by former coach Mike Phelan, who had left the club in 2013 following the retirement of Sir Alex Ferguson. On 28 March 2019, Solskjær became full-time manager.

Pre-season and friendlies

United preceded their 2018–19 campaign with a tour of the United States. The first three games were announced on 3 April 2018, with the opposition provided by Club América, San Jose Earthquakes and Liverpool. The club later announced that the tour would see them compete in the International Champions Cup. In the 2018 competition, United played against Milan at the StubHub Center in Carson, California, Liverpool at the Michigan Stadium in Ann Arbor, Michigan, and Real Madrid at the Hard Rock Stadium in Miami Gardens, Florida. Alexis Sánchez's arrival in the United States was delayed as he was not issued with a visa due to the 16-month suspended jail sentence he accepted in February for tax fraud during his time in Spain. The final pre-season game saw Manchester United play away to Bayern Munich at the Allianz Arena on 5 August.

Premier League

Matches
The Premier League announced the fixtures for the 2018–19 season on 14 June 2018.

League table

FA Cup

As one of the 20 teams in the Premier League, Manchester United entered the FA Cup in the Third Round. The draw was made on 3 December 2018 and paired United with Reading, whom they had faced at the same stage two seasons earlier, when they won 4–0. United won the match 2–0; Juan Mata opened the scoring from the penalty spot after the video assistant referee ruled that Omar Richards had tripped Juan Mata in the penalty area, and another goal from Romelu Lukaku. 19-year-old winger Tahith Chong made his FA Cup debut, replacing Juan Mata in the 62nd minute. The draw for the Fourth Round was made on 7 January 2019 and United were drawn away to Arsenal; the last time the two sides had met in the FA Cup was in the Sixth Round of the 2014–15 season, when Arsenal won 2–1 at Old Trafford. This time Manchester United won 3–1; two goals in two minutes from former Arsenal forward Alexis Sánchez and Jesse Lingard put United 2–0 up with just over half an hour played, but Pierre-Emerick Aubameyang got one back for the Gunners shortly before half-time. Anthony Martial then came off the bench to seal the win for United with their third goal in the 82nd minute. The draw for the Fifth Round was made on 28 January 2019 and United were drawn away to Chelsea, whom they had faced in the final the previous season. Goals from Paul Pogba and Ander Herrera before half-time sealed a 2–0 win for United. They were then drawn away to Wolverhampton Wanderers in the quarter-finals. Goals from Raúl Jiménez and Diogo Jota gave Wolves a 2–1 win and a place in the semi-finals, with Marcus Rashford scoring a consolation goal for United in the 95th minute.

EFL Cup

The draw for the third round of the EFL Cup was made on 30 August 2018, with Manchester United drawn at home to Derby County. United took the lead just three minutes in through Juan Mata, but an equaliser from Harry Wilson was followed by a red card for United keeper Romero. Marriot gave Derby the lead with five minutes to go, but Marouane Fellaini’s stoppage-time strike ensured penalties; however Derby won 8-7 on spot kicks.

UEFA Champions League

Group stage

The draw for the group stage of the 2018–19 UEFA Champions League was made in Monaco on 30 August 2018.

Knockout phase

The draw for the round of 16 was held on 17 December 2018, 12:00 CET, at the UEFA headquarters in Nyon, Switzerland. After finishing second in their group and progressing to the round of 16, United were drawn against French champions Paris Saint-Germain in the first competitive meeting between the two sides. In the first leg at Old Trafford, goals from Presnel Kimpembe and Kylian Mbappé gave PSG a 2–0 lead to take back to the Parc des Princes. Needing to score three times to progress, Romelu Lukaku opened the scoring for United in the second minute of the second leg, before Juan Bernat restored PSG's two-goal aggregate lead less than 10 minutes later. Lukaku then scored again after half an hour, to bring United within a goal of the quarter-finals. Former Manchester United midfielder Ángel Di María had the ball in the back of the net early in the second half, only for the goal to be ruled out for offside, and Bernat hit the post late on after Mbappé had rounded David de Gea. In the 90th minute, referee Damir Skomina awarded United a penalty after using a VAR review to adjudge Kimpembe to have handled the ball in the penalty area. Marcus Rashford scored the spot-kick to make it 3–3 on aggregate and send United through to the quarter-finals on the away goals rule; this made them the first team in Champions League history to progress after losing by at least two goals at home in the first leg. Solskjær gave 17-year-old forward Mason Greenwood and 19-year-old winger Tahith Chong their European debuts, the former also playing his first senior game.

The draw for the quarter-finals was held on 15 March 2019, with United paired with Barcelona. Both United and Manchester City were originally drawn to play their home legs in the same week; as United finished lower in the league the previous season, their tie was reversed. The first leg was played at Old Trafford on 10 April 2019. Barcelona won 1–0 thanks to an own goal by Luke Shaw that was originally ruled out for offside; the decision was later overturned after a VAR review. The second leg was played at Camp Nou on 16 April, with two goals from Lionel Messi and another from former Liverpool forward Philippe Coutinho giving the Spanish side a 3–0 win on the night, 4–0 on aggregate.

Squad statistics

Statistics accurate as of 12 May 2019.

Transfers

In

Out

Loan out

Notes

References

2018-19
Manchester United
Manchester United